Levi Ives (born 28 July 1997) is a footballer who plays as a left-back for Cliftonville.

Club career
Ives began his career at Torquay United. He made 20 appearances in his first season, attracting attention from Premier League and EFL Championship teams. Ives left Torquay United in 2015.

In 2015, Ives joined Cliftonville. On 17 October 2015, Ives made his debut against Portadown. He helped Cliftonville win the 2015–16 Northern Ireland Football League Cup and 2021–22 Northern Ireland Football League Cup.

Honours
Cliftonville
Irish League Cup: 2015-16, 2021-22
County Antrim Shield: 2019-20

References

1997 births
Living people
Association footballers from Northern Ireland
Cliftonville F.C. players
Torquay United F.C. players
NIFL Premiership players